Sharr Mountains National Park or Šar Mountains National Park may refer to:
 Sharr Mountains National Park (Kosovo), national park in Kosovo
 , national park in North Macedonia